Vars-sur-Roseix is a commune in the Corrèze department in central France.

Population

Notable people

 Hugues Duroy de Chaumareys (1763-1841) Incompetent captain of the French frigate Méduse (1810) that sank with the loss of circa 150 lives.

See also
Communes of the Corrèze department

References

Communes of Corrèze
Corrèze communes articles needing translation from French Wikipedia